The Center Point Covered Bridge is a historic covered bridge near Center Point, Doddridge County, West Virginia, United States.

It was commissioned by the County Court and was built between 1888 and 1890. It spans Pike's Fork (Middle Fork) of McElroy Creek. The masons were T.C. Ancell and E. Underwood (who charged $976.54 for all abutments). The carpenters were John Ash and S.H. Smith (who charged $230). The design utilizes the Long Truss.

As of 1983, the Center Point Covered Bridge was one of only 17 covered bridges left in West Virginia.

It was listed on the National Register of Historic Places in 1983.

References

See also
List of West Virginia covered bridges

Covered bridges on the National Register of Historic Places in West Virginia
Bridges completed in 1889
Buildings and structures in Doddridge County, West Virginia
National Register of Historic Places in Doddridge County, West Virginia
Road bridges on the National Register of Historic Places in West Virginia
Wooden bridges in West Virginia
Long truss bridges in the United States